L'anima del filosofo, ossia Orfeo ed Euridice (The Soul of the Philosopher, or Orpheus and Euridice), Hob. 28/13, is an opera in Italian in four acts by Joseph Haydn, the last he wrote. The libretto, by Carlo Francesco Badini, is based on the myth of Orpheus and Euridice as told in Ovid's Metamorphoses. Composed in 1791, the opera was never performed during Haydn's lifetime.

Background
After his patron Prince Nikolaus Esterházy had died in 1790, Haydn travelled to London where he received a commission to write several symphonies. The impresario John Gallini offered him a contract to write an opera for The King's Theatre but due to a dispute between King George III and the Prince of Wales he was refused permission to stage it in May 1791. There are some uncertainties about why the opera was banned at the time.

The score was nearly completed but was not published in its complete form before the 20th century. It was partially published by Breitkopf & Härtel in c. 1807.

Various manuscripts were scattered in several European libraries. H. C. Robbins Landon did much to assemble the available scores.

Performance history
L'anima del filosofo remained unperformed until 9 June 1951, when it appeared at the Teatro della Pergola, Florence, with a cast including Maria Callas and Boris Christoff, under the conductor Erich Kleiber.

The UK premiere was in 1955, a concert performance at the St Pancras Festival. This was the debut of the baritone Derek Hammond-Stroud.

It has been performed and recorded several times since then.

The opera makes extensive use of the chorus.

Roles

The opera is scored for two flutes, two oboes, two clarinets, two cors anglais, two bassoons, two horns, two trumpets, two trombones, timpani, harp, strings, continuo.

References

External links 

Italian-language operas
Operas by Joseph Haydn
Operas
1791 operas
Operas about Orpheus
Operas based on Metamorphoses